Leander D'Cunha (born 25 October 1997)  is an Indian professional footballer who plays as a defender for Goa in the Indian Super League.

Career

Youth and early career
Born in Cuncolim, Leander  began playing football in inter-village tournaments in different age groups. Leander then joined Sesa in 2012 and remained their for 2 years until 2014. Later he joined Churchill Brothers and remained their till 2017. Leander represented Goa football team in Santosh Trophy during 2017.

In 2017, Leander joined Goa B and captained the team during 2019 season.

Goa
On 15 June 2020, Leander signed a three-year contract extension with Goa, keeping him at the club until 2023, earning promotion to the first team for 2020–21 season. On 5 March 2021, Leander made his debut professional appearance for the club in the 2 leg of the 2020–21 Indian Super League playoffs against Mumbai City. He came on as 34th minute substitute for injured Seriton Fernandes as the game ended on 2–2 draw. He made his first continental appearance for the club on 23 April in 2021 AFC Champions League group stage match against Persepolis.

Career statistics

Club

Honours
Goa
Durand Cup: 2021

References

External links

Leander D'Cunha at Indian Super League

Indian footballers
1997 births
Living people
People from South Goa district
Footballers from Goa
Association football forwards
Goa Professional League players
Indian Super League players
SESA Football Academy players
Churchill Brothers FC Goa players
FC Goa players